Nebria baicalopacifica is a species of ground beetle in the Nebriinae subfamily that is endemic to Russia.

Distribution
The species are found in northern part of Irkutsk and Khabarovsk cities of Buryat Republic.

References

baicalopacifica
Beetles described in 2006
Endemic fauna of Buryatia